Bank of Baroda (BOB or BoB) is an central public sector bank under the ownership of Ministry of Finance, Government of India. It is headquartered in Vadodara, Gujarat. It is the second largest public sector bank in India after State Bank of India, with 132 million customers, a total business of US$218 billion, and a global presence of 100 overseas offices. Based on 2019 data, it is ranked 1145 on Forbes Global 2000 list.

The Maharaja of Baroda, Sayajirao Gaekwad III, founded the bank on 20 July 1908 in the princely state of Baroda, in Gujarat. The Government of India nationalized the Bank of Baroda, along with 13 other major commercial banks of India, on 19 July 1969 and the bank was designated as a profit-making public sector undertaking (PSU).

History

In 1908, Sayajirao Gaekwad III, set up the Bank of Baroda (BoB), with other stalwarts of industry such as Sampatrao Gaekwad, Ralph Whitenack, Vithaldas Thakersey, Lallubhai Samaldas, Tulsidas Kilachand and NM Chokshi. Two years later, BoB established its first branch in Ahmedabad. The bank grew domestically until after World War II. Then in 1953 it crossed the Indian Ocean to serve the communities of Indians in Kenya and Indians in Uganda by establishing a branch each in Mombasa and Kampala. The next year it opened a second branch in Kenya, in Nairobi, and in 1956 it opened a branch in Tanzania at Dar-es-Salaam. Then in 1957, BoB took a big step abroad by establishing a branch in London. London was the center of the British Commonwealth and the most important international banking center. In 1958 BoB acquired Hind Bank (Calcutta; est. 1943), which became BoB's first domestic acquisition.

1960s

In 1961, BoB acquired New Citizen Bank of India. This merger helped it increase its branch network in Maharashtra. BoB also opened a branch in Fiji. The next year it opened a branch in Mauritius

In 1963, BoB acquired Surat Banking Corporation in Surat, Gujarat. The next year BoB acquired two banks: Umbergaon People's Bank in southern Gujarat and Tamil Nadu Central Bank in Tamil Nadu state.

In 1965, BoB opened a branch in Guyana. That same year BoB lost its branch in Narayanganj (East Pakistan) due to the Indo-Pakistani War of 1965. It is unclear when BoB had opened the branch. In 1967 it suffered a second loss of branches when the Tanzanian government nationalised BoB's three branches there at (Dar es Salaam, Mwanga, and Moshi), and transferred their operations to the Tanzanian government-owned National Banking Corporation.

In 1969, the Indian government nationalised 14 top banks including BoB. BoB incorporated its operations in Uganda as a 51% subsidiary, with the government owning the rest.

1970s

In 1972, BoB acquired Bank of India's operations in Uganda. Two years later, BoB opened a branch each in Dubai and Abu Dhabi.

Back in India, in 1975, BoB acquired the majority shareholding and management control of Bareilly Corporation Bank (est. 1954) and Nainital Bank (est. in 1922), both in Uttar Pradesh and Uttarakhand respectively. Since then, Nainital Bank has expanded to Uttarakhand, Uttar Pradesh, Haryana, Rajasthan and Delhi state. Right now BoB have 99% shareholding in Nainital Bank.

International expansion continued in 1976 with the opening of a branch in Oman and another in Brussels. The Brussels branch was aimed at Indian firms from Mumbai (Bombay) engaged in diamond cutting and jewellery having business in Antwerp, a major center for diamond cutting.

Two years later, BoB opened a branch in New York and another in the Seychelles. Then in 1979, BoB opened a branch in Nassau, the Bahamas.

1980s

In 1980, BoB opened a branch in Bahrain and a representative office in Sydney, Australia. BoB, Union Bank of India and Indian Bank established IUB International Finance, a licensed deposit taker, in Hong Kong. Each of the three banks took an equal share. Eventually (in 1999), BoB would buy out its partners.

A second consortium or joint-venture bank followed in 1985. BoB (20%), Bank of India (20%), Central Bank of India (20%) and ZIMCO (Zambian government; 40%) established Indo-Zambia Bank in Lusaka. That same year BoB also opened an Offshore Banking Unit (OBU) in Bahrain (Gulf).

Back in India, in 1988, BoB acquired Traders Bank, which had a network of 34 branches in Delhi.

1990s

In 1992, BoB opened an OBU in Mauritius, but closed its representative office in Sydney. The next year BoB took over the London branches of Union Bank of India and Punjab & Sind Bank (P&S). P&S's branch had been established before 1970 and Union Bank's after 1980. The Reserve Bank of India ordered the takeover of the two following the banks' involvement in the Sethia fraud in 1987 and subsequent losses.

In 1996, BoB Bank entered the capital market in December with an initial public offering (IPO). The government of India is still the largest shareholder, owning 66% of the bank's equity.

In 1997, BoB opened a branch in Durban. The next year BoB bought out its partners in IUB International Finance in Hong Kong. Apparently this was a response to regulatory changes following Hong Kong's reversion to the People's Republic of China. The now wholly owned subsidiary became Bank of Baroda (Hong Kong), a restricted license bank. BoB also acquired Punjab Cooperative Bank in a rescue. BoB incorporate a wholly–owned subsidiary, BOB Capital Markets, for broking business.

In 1999, BoB merged in Bareilly Corporation Bank in another rescue. At the time, Bareilly had 64 branches, including four in Delhi. In Guyana, BoB incorporated its branch as a subsidiary, Bank of Baroda Guyana. BoB added a branch in Mauritius and closed its Harrow Branch in London.

2000s
In 2000 BoB established Bank of Baroda (Botswana). The bank has three banking offices, two in Gaborone and one in Francistown. In 2002, BoB converted its subsidiary in Hong Kong from deposit taking company to a Restricted License Bank.

In 2002 BoB acquired Benares State Bank (BSB) at the Reserve Bank of India's request. BSB had been established in 1946 but traced its origins back to 1871 and its function as the treasury office of the Benares state. In 1964 BSB had acquired Bareilly Bank (est. 1934), with seven branches in western districts of Uttar Pradesh; BSB also had taken over Lucknow Bank in 1968. The acquisition of BSB brought BoB 105 new branches. Lucknow Bank, a unit bank with its only office in Aminabad, had been established in 1913. Also in 2002, BoB listed Bank of Baroda (Uganda) on the Uganda Securities Exchange (USE). The next year BoB opened an OBU in Mumbai.

In 2004 BoB acquired the failed south Gujarat Local Area Bank. BoB also returned to Tanzania by establishing a subsidiary in Dar-es-Salaam. BoB also opened a representative office each in Kuala Lumpur, Malaysia, and Guangdong, China.
 
In 2005 BoB built a Global Data Centre (DC) in Mumbai for running its centralised banking solution (CBS) and other applications in more than 1,900 branches across India and 20 other counties where the bank operates. BoB also opened a representative office in Thailand.

In 2006 BoB established an Offshore Banking Unit (OBU) in Singapore.

In 2007, its centenary year, BoB's total business crossed 2.09 trillion (short scale), its branches crossed 2000, and its global customer base 29 million people. In Hong Kong, Bank got Full Fledged Banking license and business of its Restricted License Banking subsidiary was taken over Bank of Baroda branch in Hong Kong w.e.f.01.04.2007.

In 2008 BoB opened a branch in Guangzhou, China (02/08/2008) and in Kenton, Harrow United Kingdom. BoB opened a joint venture life insurance company with Andhra Bank and Legal & General (UK) called IndiaFirst Life Insurance Company.

In 2009 Bank of Baroda (New Zealand) was registered.  BoB (NZ) has 3 branches: two in Auckland, one in Wellington.

2010s
In 2010 Malaysia awarded a commercial banking licence to a locally incorporated bank to be jointly owned by Bank of Baroda, Indian Overseas Bank and Andhra Bank.

In 2011 BoB opened an Electronic Banking Service Unit (EBSU) at Hamriya Free Zone, Sharjah (UAE). It also opened four new branches in existing operations in Uganda, Kenya (2), and Guyana. BoB closed its representative office in Malaysia in anticipation of the opening of its consortium bank there. BoB received 'In Principle' approval for the upgrading of its representative office in Australia to a branch. Bob also acquired Mumbai-based Memon Cooperative Bank, which had 225 employees and 15 branches in Maharashtra and three in Gujarat. It had to suspend operations in May 2009 due to its precarious financial condition.

The Malaysian consortium bank, India International Bank Malaysia (IIBM), finally opened in Kuala Lumpur, which has a large population of Indians. BOB owns 40%, Andhra Bank owns 25%, and IOB the remaining 35% of the share capital. IIBM seeks to open five branches within its first year of operations in Malaysia, and intends to grow to 15 branches within the next three years.

On 17 September 2018, the government of India proposed the merger of Dena Bank and Vijaya Bank with the Bank of Baroda, pending approval from the boards of the three banks, effectively creating the third largest lender in the country. The merger was approved by the Union Cabinet and the boards of the banks on 2 January 2019. Under the terms of the merger, Dena Bank and Vijaya Bank shareholders received 110 and 402 equity shares of the Bank of Baroda, respectively, of face value 2 for every 1,000 shares they held. The merger came into effect on 1 April 2019. Post-merger, the Bank of Baroda is the third largest bank in India, after State Bank of India and HDFC Bank. The consolidated entity has over 9,500 branches, 13,400 ATMs, 85,000 employees and serves 120 million customers. The amalgamation is the first-ever three-way consolidation of banks in the country, with a combined business of Rs14.82 trillion (short scale), making it the third largest bank after State Bank of India (SBI) and ICICI Bank. Post-merger effective 1 April 2019, the bank has become the India's third largest lender behind SBI and ICICI Bank.

Bank of Baroda announced in May 2019 that it would either close or rationalise 800–900 branches to increase operational efficiency and reduce duplication post-merger. The regional and zonal offices of the merged companies would also be closed. PTI quoted an unnamed senior bank official as stating that Bank of Baroda would look to expand in eastern India as it already had a strong presence in the other regions.

Subsidiaries

 BOB Capital Markets (BOBCAPS) is a SEBI-registered investment banking company based in Mumbai, Maharashtra. It is a wholly owned subsidiary of Bank of Baroda. Its financial services portfolio includes initial public offerings, private placement of debts, corporate restructuring, business valuation, mergers and acquisition, project appraisal, loan syndication, institutional equity research, and brokerage.
 Nainital Bank (98.57%) was established in the year 1922 with the objective to cater banking needs of the people of the region. In the year 1973, Reserve Bank of India directed Bank of Baroda, to manage the affairs of the Nainital Bank Limited.
 BOB Financial Solutions Limited
 Baroda Asset Management India Limited
 India First life Insurance Company Limited (44%)
 India Infradebt Limited (40.99%)
 BOB (UK) Limited
 Baroda Global Shared Services Ltd.
 Baroda UP Bank

Shareholding 

The shareholding structure of the bank  is as follows:

International presence

The bank has 107 branches/offices in 24 countries (excluding India) including 61 branches/offices of the bank, 38 branches of its 8 subsidiaries and 1 representative office in Thailand. The Bank of Baroda has a joint venture in Zambia with 16 branches.

Among the Bank of Baroda's overseas branches are ones in the world's major financial centres (e.g., New York, London, Dubai, Hong Kong, Brussels and Singapore), as well as a number in other countries. The bank is engaged in retail banking via the branches of subsidiaries in Botswana, Guyana, Kenya, Tanzania, and Uganda. The bank plans has recently upgraded its representative office in Australia to a branch and set up a joint venture commercial bank in Malaysia. It has a large presence in Mauritius with about nine branches spread out in the country.

The Bank of Baroda has received permission or in-principle approval from host country regulators to open new offices in Trinidad and Tobago and Ghana, where it seeks to establish joint ventures or subsidiaries. The bank has received Reserve Bank of India approval to open offices in the Maldives, and New Zealand. It is seeking approval for operations in Bahrain, South Africa, Kuwait, Mozambique, and Qatar, and is establishing offices in Canada, New Zealand, Sri Lanka, Bahrain, Saudi Arabia, and Russia. It also has plans to extend its existing operations in the United Kingdom, the United Arab Emirates, and Botswana.

The tagline of Bank of Baroda is "India's International Bank".

Affiliates
IndiaFirst Life Insurance Company is a joint venture between Bank of Baroda (44%) and fellow Indian state-owned bank Andhra Bank (30%), and UK's financial and investment company Legal & General (26%). It was incorporated in November, 2009 and has its headquarters in Mumbai. The company started strongly, achieving a turnover in excess of   2 billion in its first four and half months.

Bank of Baroda and HDFC Bank are partner banks in Chillr Mobile app. Non-partner bank customers can only receive funds. Only the mobile number of the beneficiary in the remitter's phonebook is needed. Application enables customers to send money to any registered Chillr user on phone contact list.

Recent developments
 Bank of Baroda acquired the semi naming rights of Sikanderpur metro station in Gurugram. This is the first time that a public sector bank has bagged the naming right of a metro station. They followed a similar approach with Mumbai Metro where Andheri metro station has been named as Bank of Baroda Andheri
 Bank of Baroda sealed a 3-year principal sponsorship contract with Olympics 2016 Women's badminton silver medalist P. V. Sindhu and India's No 1 ranked Men's Badminton player Srikanth Kidambi.
 Bank of Baroda became the first National Supporter (Indian sponsor) of the FIFA U-17 World Cup India 2017, the first football World Cup to be hosted in India

South Africa corruption controversy
On the 4 September 2017 the South Africa Financial Intelligence Centre fined Bank of Baroda  11 million (equivalent to US$837,000) for flouting anti-corruption laws in transactions on accounts owned by the Gupta family. Following the flagging of 36 suspicious transactions through Gupta-family-owned accounts over a ten-month period valued at 4.2 billion, the bank tried to close the accounts. The Gupta family has filed an interdict against the bank to prevent it from closing their accounts. During February 2018, it was announced that the Bank of Baroda has given notification to the South African Reserve Bank that it will be exiting the country.

The bank played a crucial role in the Gupta family's business dealings.  According to a report by the Organized Crime and Corruption Reporting Project (OCCRP), the Bank of Baroda allowed the Gupta family to move millions of dollars in alleged corrupt business transactions to offshore accounts. Although the Bank of Baroda denies the illicit behavior, the documents report that the bank's South African branch issued unapproved loan guarantees, ignored internal compliance efforts, and averted regulators from learning about suspicious transactions in a way that benefited the Guptas’ network.  Around 4.5m Rand has circulated around a handful of Gupta-associated companies between 2007 and 2017.  Due to the volume of Gupta owned accounts, the majority of the bank's transactions in Johannesburg involved Gupta family funds.

Reports reveal that inter-company loans provided an untraceable and inexplicable technique used by the Gupta brothers to transfer money from the Bank to various Gupta-owned companies like Trillion Financial Advisory and Centaur Mining. The suspicious activity reports (SARs) filed by workers at the Bank of Baroda related to Gupta transactions were often voided by managers and higher-level bank officials. Most SARs failed to reach the South African Financial Intelligence Centre as a result.

See also

Indian banking
Indian Financial System Code
IndiaFirst Life Insurance Company
List of banks in India

References

Further reading

External links

 

 
Banks established in 1908
Companies nationalised by the Government of India
Public Sector Banks in India
Companies based in Vadodara
Indian brands
Indian companies established in 1908
Companies listed on the National Stock Exchange of India
Companies listed on the Bombay Stock Exchange